The Tassie Medal was awarded to the outstanding player at each Australian rules football Interstate Carnival or Australian interstate championship series held between 1937 and 1988 with the exception of the 1975 knock-out series.

The medal is named after Eric Tassie who was a South Australian football administrator who served with distinction on the Australian National Football Council.

Unlike with many other such awards, for example the Brownlow Medal, the word 'fairest' was never included in the description, meaning that reported players remained eligible to receive it.

Due to the demise of State of Origin football there hasn't been a carnival since 1988 hence the reason the award has not since been presented.

Tassie Medal Winners

References and notes

Australian rules football awards
Australian sports trophies and awards
Australian rules football-related lists